Mohini Mansion Ki Cinderellayain is a 2018 Pakistani television comedy drama series that premiered on 3 December 2018 on Bol Entertainment, directed by Ali Tahir and written by Fasih Bari Khan. It stars Qavi Khan and veteran actresses Shabnam and Faryal Gohar in lead roles. The series is produced by Bol Entertainment.

Cast
 Shabnam as Shabana Jharna
 Rubya Chaudhry as Shamamah
 Qavi Khan as Zangu
 Faryal Gohar as Daaro Maasi
 Saima Saleem as Azra
 Hira Khan as Kaali
 Naeem Tahir as Chacha Radio
 Yasmeen Tahir as Zubeida
 Heena Chaudhry as Billi
 Sardar Nabeel as Uzair
 Imaan Malik as Laatu
 Waqas Irfan as Puppu Chocolaty
 Shah Fahad as Maulvi
 Sumbul Shahid as Aapa Jan
 Nirvaan Nadeem as Billa
 Tahira Imam as Mukhtaaran
 Usama Khan as Azmat
 Farah Tufail as Pino
 Umer Darr

Production

Development
In October 2017, Ali Tahir revealed that he is going to direct a comedy serial for Bol Entertainment titled as 'Mohini Mansion Ki Cinderellayain' which is scripted by Quddusi Sahab Ki Bewah fame Fasih Bari Khan. The serial explore the lives of a whole neighborhood set in 1992 in internal Lahore.
He also revealed that there will be over 52 episodes.

Casting
Veteran actress Shabnam showed her interest in making a comeback on Pakistani television during her visit to Pakistan. Actor and director Ali Tahir cast her as lead protagonist in his directorial, Mohini Mansion Ki Cinderella for Bol Entertainment. Thus the series marks the comeback of Shabnam to Pakistani television screens after 18 years. Veteran actress Faryal Gohar also made her return to television after 15 years with this series. Tahir also cast his parents Naeem Tahir and Yasmeen Tahir. The series also stars the model Rubya Chaudhry and debutants including Miss Veet 2017 winner Hira Khan, and Sardar Nabeel.

References

Pakistani television series